Soyuz-17 Cliff is a prominent rock cliff, 3.5 nautical miles (6 km) long, on the north side of Carlyon Glacier in the Cook Mountains. The cliff is 4 nautical miles (7 km) west-northwest of Cape Murray and rises to c. . Named after the Soviet spacecraft Soyuz 17 of January 17, 1975.

Cliffs of Oates Land